Kohat Cantonment railway station is  located in Kohat, Pakistan. The station serves as the terminus for the Khushalgarh–Kohat–Thal Railway.

See also
 List of railway stations in Pakistan
 Pakistan Railways

References

Railway stations in Kohat District
Railway stations on Khushalgarh–Kohat–Thal Railway